Deepak Bahry is a Bollywood film director and producer active since the mid-1970s. He is perhaps best known for his family-oriented action drama films, in which he often cast actors such as Mithun Chakraborty and Jagdeep throughout the late 1970s and 1980s in films such as Tarana (1979) and Ustadi Ustad Se (1982) and Ajay Devgan in the leading role in films such as Ek Hi Raasta in 1993. At one point in his career he had set up his own film company Bahry Films.

However his 1991 romantic film Kurbaan starring Salman Khan, Ayesha Jhulka, Sunil Dutt and Kabir Bedi was successful and Parwana in 2003, his last film in which once again cast Ajay Devgan as the leading actor.

He is maternal uncle of Bollywood character actor Divya Dutta.

Filmography
Jab Andhera Hota Hai (1974)
Agent Vinod (1977)
Tarana (1979)
Hum Se Badhkar Kaun (1981)
Gehra Zakhm (1981)
Ustadi Ustad Se (1982)
Hum Se Hai Zamana (1983)
Woh Jo Hasina (1983)
Deewana Tere Naam Ka (1987)
Humse Na Takrana (1990)
Patthar (1991)
Kurbaan (1991)
Ek Hi Raasta (1993)
Hum Hain Bemisaal (1994)
Kaala Samrajya (1999)
Parwana (2003)

External links
 

Year of birth missing (living people)
20th-century Indian film directors
Hindi-language film directors
Hindi film producers
Living people